KXLE-FM is a radio station located in Ellensburg, Washington, United States, operating on a frequency of 95.3 MHz with an effective radiated power of 51,000 watts.  As of 2019, the programming format of the station is country music. The format has mostly been the same since its launch in 1972. The transmitter tower for the station is located on Lookout Mountain, east of Cle Elum . The station can be heard as far as Snoqualmie Pass and the central Columbia Basin.

References

External links
KXLE-FM Website

XLE-FM
Kittitas County, Washington
Country radio stations in the United States
Radio stations established in 1972
1972 establishments in Washington (state)